Carmen is a 1984 French-Italian film directed by Francesco Rosi. It is a film version of Bizet's opera, Carmen. Julia Migenes stars in the title role, Plácido Domingo as Don José, Ruggero Raimondi as Escamillo, and Faith Esham as Micaela. Lorin Maazel conducts the Orchestre National de France.

The film premiered in France on March 14, 1984, and in the U.S. on September 20 of that year. In 1985, the film was nominated for the Golden Globe Award for Best Foreign Film.

Cast
 Julia Migenes-Johnson as Carmen
 Plácido Domingo as Don José
 Ruggero Raimondi as Escamillo
 Faith Esham as Micaëla
 François le Roux as Moralès
 John-Paul Bogart as Zuñiga
 Susan Daniel as Mercédès
 Lillian Watson as Frasquita
 Jean-Philippe Lafont as Dancaïre
 Gérard Garino as Remendado
 Julien Guiomar as Lillas Pastia
 Accursio Di Leo as Guide
 Maria Campano as Manuelita
 Cristina Hoyos as dancer
 Juan Antonio Jiménez as dancer

Production
Rosi selected 1875 for the period and filmed entirely on locations in Andalusia, using Ronda and Carmona and Seville itself to simulate the Seville of that era. He worked with his longtime collaborator, the cinematographer Pasqualino De Santis, and with Enrico Job supervising the sets and costumes. Rosi acknowledged Gustave Doré's illustrations of Spain for Baron Charles Davillier's Spain (which was published in serial form in 1873) as his principal source for the visual design. He believed that Bizet, who never visited Spain, was guided by these engravings, and shot scenes in some of the exact places that Doré drew.

Critical reception
Pauline Kael reviews the film favourably in her collection of movie reviews, State of the Art:
Julia Migenes-Johnson's freckled, gamine Carmen is the chief glory of the production. Her strutting, her dark, messy, frizzy hair—her sexual availability—attract Don José and drive him crazy. Carmen, who's true to her instincts, represents everything he tries to repress. But after he has deserted the Army and lost the respectability that meant everything to him, he thinks she owes him lifelong devotion. Carmen's mistake was in thinking she could take him as a lover on her own terms.

Home media
In late 2011 the film was released on both a regular, anamorphically enhanced Region 1 DVD, and on Blu-ray.

Awards and nominations

 1984 - Golden Globes
Nomination: Best Foreign Language Film (France)
 1986 - BAFTA Awards
Nomination: Best Foreign Film (Italy) 
Nomination: Best Sound for Dominique Hennequin, Hugues Darmois, Bernard Leroux, and Harald Maury
 1985  - César Award
Best Sound for Dominique Hennequin, Guy Level, and Harald Maury
Nomination: Best Film for Francesco Rosi
Nomination: Best Director for Francesco Rosi
Nomination: Best Actress for Julia Migenes-Johnson
Nomination: Best Cinematography for Pasqualino De Santis 
Nomination: Best Production Design for Enrico Job
Nomination: Best Costume Design for Enrico Job
1985 - David di Donatello
Best Film for Francesco Rosi
Best Director for Francesco Rosi
Best Cinematography for Pasqualino De Santis
Best Sets and Decorations for Enrico Job
Best Costumes for Enrico Job
Best Editing for Ruggero Mastroianni
Nomination: Best Actress for Julia Migenes-Johnson
Nomination: Best Supporting Actor for Ruggero Raimondi
1985 - Nastro d'argento
Best Scenography for Enrico Job
1985 - Grammy Award (soundtrack only)
Best Opera Recording for Michel Glotz (audio producer), Lorin Maazel (conductor), Julia Migenes-Johnson, Plácido Domingo, Ruggero Raimondi, and Faith Esham (soloists)

References

External links
 
 

1984 films
1980s musical drama films
Italian musical drama films
French musical drama films
1980s French-language films
Films directed by Francesco Rosi
Films based on Carmen
Films set in the 19th century
Films set in Spain
Georges Bizet
Opera films
1984 drama films
Films about Romani people
Bullfighting films
1980s Italian films
1980s French films
French-language Italian films